Lia Neal (born February 13, 1995) is a former American professional swimmer who specialized in freestyle events. In her Olympic debut at the 2012 Summer Olympics in London, she won a bronze medal in the 4×100-meter freestyle relay. In 2016, she won a silver medal in the same event at Rio de Janeiro. She was the second female African-American swimmer to make a U.S. Olympic team.

Early life
Lia Neal was born in Brooklyn, New York in 1995, the daughter of Siu and Jerome Neal. Lia Neal is of African and Chinese descent. She started swimming when she was six years old in New York City. She attended the Convent of the Sacred Heart School in New York City, where she was a member of the club swim team, Asphalt Green Unified Aquatics.

Career

2008 US Olympic Trials
Neal competed at the 2008 US Olympic Trials in swimming in Omaha, Nebraska from June to July 2008 when she was 13 years old. She ranked 28th in the 50-meter freestyle and 78th in the 100-meter freestyle.

2012

2012 US Olympic Trials
At the 2012 United States Olympic Trials in Omaha, Nebraska, the U.S. qualifying meet for the Olympics, Neal made the U.S. Olympic team by finishing fourth in the 100-meter freestyle with a time of 54.33 seconds, which qualified her to swim in the 4×100-meter freestyle relay.

Neal was 17 years old when she became the second female African-American swimmer to qualify for a U.S. Olympic swimming team. She was also highlighted for the geographical diversity she brought to the U.S. Olympic swimming team as she was not from a warm-weather state, such as Florida or California, where U.S. Olympic swimmers typically come from.

2012 Summer Olympics

At the 2012 Summer Olympics in London, Neal won a bronze medal in the 4×100-meter freestyle relay with Missy Franklin, Jessica Hardy and Allison Schmitt, with the U.S. team finishing third behind the teams from Australia and the Netherlands. Swimming the third leg, Neal had a split of 53.65 seconds and the U.S. team finished with a total time of 3:34.24, an American record. Neal was chosen to swim in the final based on her performance in the heats of the 4×100-meter freestyle. Swimming the lead-off leg in the heats, Neal posted a time of 54.15.

Neal made history with fellow African-American swimmers Anthony Ervin and Cullen Jones by being the first three African-Americans on a US Olympic swim team with more than one African-American swimmer. She was also a senior in high school and the first student from the Convent of the Sacred Heart since its founding in 1881 to compete in an Olympic Games.

2015

In 2015, Neal became one of the first three African-American swimmers to place in the top three spots at the 100-yard freestyle in any Women’s Division I NCAA Swimming Championship; Simone Manuel was first, Neal was second and Natalie Hinds was third.

2016 Summer Olympics

In 2016 at Rio de Janeiro, Brazil, Neal won a silver medal at the Olympic Games in the Women's 4 × 100 m freestyle relay, swimming in the preliminary heats of the race.

2017
From 2013 to 2017, Neal competed collegiately for Stanford University where she was an 8-time NCAA champion.

2019 World Championships

In July 2019 at the 2019 World Aquatics Championships in Gwangju, South Korea, Lia Neal anchored the 4x100-meter freestyle relay swimming a 54.41 and winning a silver medal in the finals.

2020
In April 2020 Neal shared a bit about herself and her efforts to widen the perspective of swimmers, including herself, outside the pool via a SwimSwam podcast. One of the ways she has worked to make the swimming community more visible and approachable to those outside the swimming community is through her YouTube channel. She started the channel August 19, 2016 and began uploading videos related to the diversification of perceptions of swimmers in March 2020 when she announced she was becoming a YouTuber.

2021: Retirement from competitive swimming
In May 2021, Neal announced her retirement from the sport of swimming.

Personal

Sponsorships
TYR Sport, Inc. signed Neal in 2017 as a sponsor of her professional swimming career.

See also

 List of Olympic medalists in swimming (women)
 World record progression 4 × 100 metres freestyle relay
 List of people from New York (state)
 List of people from New York City
 List of people from Brooklyn
 Diversity in swimming

References

External links
 
 
 
 
 
 

1995 births
Living people
African-American sportswomen
American sportspeople of Chinese descent
American female freestyle swimmers
Medalists at the 2012 Summer Olympics
Medalists at the FINA World Swimming Championships (25 m)
Olympic bronze medalists for the United States in swimming
Sportspeople from Brooklyn
Swimmers at the 2012 Summer Olympics
Swimmers at the 2016 Summer Olympics
Swimmers at the 2019 Pan American Games
World Aquatics Championships medalists in swimming
Convent of the Sacred Heart (NYC) alumni
Schools of the Sacred Heart alumni
Medalists at the 2016 Summer Olympics
Olympic silver medalists for the United States in swimming
Universiade medalists in swimming
Universiade gold medalists for the United States
Pan American Games medalists in swimming
Pan American Games gold medalists for the United States
Medalists at the 2015 Summer Universiade
Medalists at the 2019 Pan American Games
21st-century African-American sportspeople
21st-century African-American women